Kathleen Woodward is an American academic. She is a Lockwood Professor in Humanities and in English at the University of Washington and has been the Director of the Simpson Center for the Humanities since 2000. Her areas of specialization include 20th-century American literature and culture; discourse of the emotions; technology and science studies; and age studies; digital humanities; and gender, women, and sexuality studies. She is working on risk in the context of globalization and population aging. Her writing talks about the invisibility status of older women and she advocates for an arena of visibility.

Education 
Born Kathleen Middlekauff, Woodward attended Smith College where she received a B.A. in economics in 1966. She later attended the University of California, San Diego, where she received a Ph.D. in literature in 1976.

Career 
Woodward taught at the School for Advanced Studies in the Social Sciences (École des Hautes Études en Sciences Sociales) in Paris. She has received institutional grants from the Mellon Foundation, the National Endowment for the Humanities, the Woodrow Wilson National Fellowship Foundation, the Rockefeller Foundation, and the National Endowment for the Arts.

From 1981 to 2000, she was the director of the Center for Twentieth Century Studies at the University of Wisconsin–Milwaukee, where she also taught in the Department of English and interdisciplinary program in Modern Studies. From 1995 to 2001, she was also the president of the Consortium of Humanities Centers and Institutes and continues today to serve on its international advisory board. From 2000 to 2005, she served as chair of the national advisory board of Imagining America, a network of scholars and leaders of cultural institutions who work to foster the development of campus-community partnerships. From 2003 to 2009, she served on the board of directors of the National Humanities Alliance. From 2009 to 2013, she served on the executive council of the Modern Language Association. She is currently a member of the steering committee of HASTAC (Humanities, Arts, Science, and Technology Advanced Collaboratory) and the Senate of the national organization of Phi Beta Kappa.

Personal life 
Woodward married journalist Bob Woodward, her high school sweetheart, shortly after graduating from Smith in 1966. They divorced in 1969.

Works

Books 
 Statistical Panic: Cultural Politics and Poetics of Emotions (2009)
 Aging and Its Discontents: Freud and Other Fictions (1991)
 At Last, the Real Distinguished Thing: The Late Poems of Eliot, Pound, Stevens, and Williams (1980)

Edited books 
 Figuring Age: Women, Bodies, Generations (1999) 
 The Myths of Information: Technology and Postindustrial Culture (1980) 
 Memory and Desire: Aging--Literature--Psychoanalysis (1986) (co-editor)
 The Technological Imagination: Theories and Fictions (1980) (co-editor)
 Aging and the Elderly: Humanistic Perspectives in Gerontology (1978) (co-editor)
 Discourse: Journal for Theoretical Studies in Media and Culture.

Selected essays 
 "Late Theory, Late Style: Loss and Renewal in Freud and Barthes". Aging & Gender in Literature: Studies in Creativity, ed. Anne Wyatt-Brown and Janice Rossen (Charlottesville: University of Virginia Press, 1993): 82-101.    
 "Tribute to the Older Woman: Psychoanalysis, Feminism, and Ageism". Images of Aging: Cultural Representations of Later Life, ed. Mike Featherstone and Andrew Werrick (London: Routledge, 1995): 79–96.
 "Anger…and Anger: From Freud to Feminism". Freud and the Passions, ed. John O'Neill (University Park: Pennsylvania UP, 1996): 73–95.
 "Telling Stories, Aging, Reminiscence and the Life Review". Doreen B. Townsend Center Occasional Papers 9 (Doreen B Townsend Center for the Humanities, UC Berkeley, 1997)
 "Statistical Panic". differences 11.2 (1999): 177–203.
 "Traumatic Shame: Toni Morrison, Televisual Culture, and the Cultural Politics of the Emotions". Cultural Critique 46 (Fall, 2002): 210–40.
 "Calculating Compassion". Indiana Law Journal 77.2 (2002): 223–45.
 "Against Wisdom: The Social Politics of Anger and Aging". Cultural Critique 51 (Spring 2002): 186–218.
 "A Feeling for the Cyborg". In Data Made Flesh: Embodying Information, eds. Robert Mitchell and Phillip Thurtle (New York: Routledge, 2004): 181–197.
 "Performing Age, Performing Gender". NWSA Journal 18.1 (2006): 162–189.
 "The Future of the Humanities- in the present & in public". Daedalus 138 (Winter 2009): 110–123.
 "Introduction: Thinking Feeling, Feeling Thinking". In Statistical Panic: Cultural Politics and Poetics of the Emotions. Durham: Duke University Press, 2009.
 "Assisted Living: Aging, Old Age, Memory, Aesthetics". Occasion 4 (May 2012):http://occasion.stanford.edu/node/104.
 "Work-Work Balance, Metrics, and Resetting the Balance". PMLA 127.4 (2012): 994–1000.
 "A Public Secret: Assisted Living, Caregivers, Globalization". International Journal of Ageing and Later Life 7.2 (2012):17-51.
 "Aging". In Adams, Rachel; Reiss, Benjamin; Serlin, David. Key Words for Disability Studies. New York: New York University Press. pp. 33–34. . (2015)

References 

Living people
American social scientists
American women academics
Academic staff of the School for Advanced Studies in the Social Sciences
Smith College alumni
University of California, San Diego alumni
University of Washington faculty
University of Wisconsin–Milwaukee faculty
Year of birth missing (living people)
21st-century American women